Benton Township is one of sixteen townships in Elkhart County, Indiana. As of the 2020 census, its population was 3,200, up from 2,963 at the previous census.

According to the 2020 "ACS 5-Year Estimates Data Profiles", 70.1% of the township's population spoke only English, while 23.7 spoke an "other [than Spanish] Indo-European language" (basically Pennsylvania German/German).

Geography

Cities and towns
 Millersburg (south quarter)

Unincorporated towns
 Benton

Adjacent townships
 Clinton Township (north)
 Eden Township, LaGrange County (northeast)
 Perry Township, Noble County (east)
 Sparta Township, Noble County (southeast)
 Turkey Creek Township, Kosciusko County (south)
 Van Buren Township, Kosciusko County (southwest)
 Jackson Township (west)
 Elkhart Township (northwest)

Major highways

Cemeteries
The township contains two cemeteries: Brown and Hire.

Demographics

References
 
 United States Census Bureau cartographic boundary files

External links
 Indiana Township Association
 United Township Association of Indiana

Townships in Elkhart County, Indiana
Townships in Indiana